Steven A. Tainer (born July 26, 1947) is a respected scholar and instructor of contemplative traditions. He is a logician, philosopher, teacher and writer with an extensive background in philosophy of science, mathematical logic and Asian contemplative traditions. One of the central themes of his work involves how different ways of knowing can be compared, contrasted, and/or integrated.

Biography
Steven Tainer's initial training was in Western analytic philosophy, with a particular specialization in philosophy of science. He was pursuing a PhD in philosophy of science, with great success, when he first became acquainted with Eastern philosophy. Just prior to finishing his PhD, he decided to rededicate himself to the study of Eastern philosophy and contemplative traditions. Since then, he has studied Buddhism, Taoism and Confucianism with sixteen Tibetan, Chinese and Korean teachers, as well as a number of senior monks and nuns.

Steven Tainer began his study of Tibetan Buddhism in 1970, training in the traditional way with many Tibetan masters, mostly from the Nyingma school of Tibetan Buddhism, with a particular emphasis on the Dzogchen or “Great Perfection” school. His primary teachers included Tarthang Tulku Rinpoche and Chogyal Namkhai Norbu Rinpoche. Upon the publication of Time, Space, and Knowledge in 1978, which he ghost wrote for his first instructor, Tarthang Tulku Rinpoche, he earned an advanced degree in Tibetan Buddhist studies. He was eventually named a Dharma heir of Tarthang Tulku, however he did not take up the position and decided to continue his study and practice on his own. After a collaboration with Ming Liu (born Charles Belyea) in the 1980s and eight years of training and retreat practice, Steven Tainer was declared a successor in a family lineage of yogic Taoism. In 1991 he co-authored a book with Ming Liu (Charles Belyea), Dragon's Play and together they also founded Da Yuen Circle of Yogic Taoism. In addition, starting in the mid-80's, he studied Confucian views of contemplation emphasizing exemplary conduct in ordinary life.

He taught at first under the direction of his masters in the early 1970s, and after a series of mountain retreats spanning most of 1989 and 1990, finally began teaching his own groups on his own.

He teaches Buddhism, Taoism and Confucianism, with particular emphasis on Ch'an contemplation, the "Unity of the Three Traditions" in Chinese thought, Taoist yogic practice, Tibetan dream yoga, and Indian Buddhist philosophy.

Present
Since 1995, Steven Tainer has been a faculty member of the Institute for World Religions and the Berkeley Buddhist Monastery. He has been involved in various interfaith councils and conferences. At a Monastic Interreligious Dialogue conference in 2001, Steven Tainer represented the Chinese Mahayana lineage of Master Hsuan Hua together with Rev. Heng Sure and Dr. Martin Verhoeven.

Steven Tainer has led over two hundred weekend retreats and about ninety live-in retreats (ranging from one week to one hundred days). A new series of books on his own teaching are also in progress, some with an emphasis on applications of traditional teachings to modern daily life.

Steven Tainer is one of the founders of the Kira Institute. Through collaboration between Kira colleagues, including Piet Hut, he explores the interface between modern, scientifically-framed perspectives and matters involving human values. Between 1998 and 2002, Piet Hut and Steven Tainer organised a series of annual summer schools, bringing graduate students from various disciplines together in order to engage in an open Socratic dialog, centred on science and contemplation. Also a series of articles were published in 2006 on Ways of Knowing, drawing from intensive discussions between Hut and Tainer.

Steven Tainer and Eiko Ikegami are currently working on a research project, titled "Virtual Civility, Trust, and Avatars: Ethnology in Second Life". While aiming to contribute to the knowledge of how to make virtual worlds socially meaningful collaborative knowledge productions, the study will also consider if the new virtual social forms would become the new standard forms of trust and civility in human interactions generally in real life.

Ideas
Steven Tainer has long attempted to make the essence of Eastern philosophy and practice accessible and applicable to Westerners who lead extremely busy lives. He points out a particular issue with modern people starting with an isolated self:

He also argues that this 'interconnectedness' is the basis of ethics: when we see the inter-dependency of all relationships, it is possible to implement The Golden Rule. Steven Tainer describes his view on leadership, which is unique yet highly relevant:

Together with Piet Hut, Steven Tainer has explored two distinctive ways of knowing, science and contemplation and how they can be reconciled at the Princeton Program for Interdisciplinary Studies, Institute for Advanced Study, Princeton, New Jersey. Hut and Tainer argue that scientific progress depends on insights from contemplative thinking, understood as reflection, thinking, meditation. Such ideas are especially relevant to the movement in science and technology studies to bring greater reflexivity into scientific practice, making their goals to shift towards producing knowledge to serve public interest and social justice outcomes:

In his paper Studying "No Mind": The Future of Orthogonal Approaches, Steven Tainer explores how "science and spirituality" differ and how they may co-exist in the future. One of the interesting ideas he presents is that the greatest achievement of science is science itself. He also emphasises that science doesn't stand alone, calling for a holistic approach to studies of science.

See also
Absolute (philosophy)
Cognitive psychology
Confucianism
Contemplation
Ecological psychology
Ethics
Philosophy of science
Reality in Buddhism
Taoism
Tibetan Buddhism
Zen

References

Further reading

External links
Berkeley Buddhist Monastery, Institute for World Religions
Ways of Knowing

American scholars of Buddhism
Living people
1947 births
American Buddhists